Leon Narimanovich Musayev (born 25 January 1999) is a Russian football player of Tabasaran origin. He plays as a defensive midfielder for FC Rubin Kazan.

Club career

Zenit Saint Petersburg
He made his debut in the Russian Football National League for FC Zenit-2 Saint Petersburg on 11 July 2016 in a game against FC Sokol Saratov.

He scored his first goal for Zenit-2 in the Russian Football National League match against Avangard Kursk on 12 August 2018.

In February 2019, he was moved to Zenit's main squad, and appeared during UEFA Europa League match on 21 February 2019, when Zenit won 3–1 against Fenerbahçe. He made his Russian Premier League debut for the club on 14 April 2019 in a game against FC Anzhi Makhachkala, as an 86th-minute substitute for Artem Dzyuba.

Rubin Kazan 
On 29 January 2021, he signed a 5-year contract with Russian club FC Rubin Kazan.

Career statistics

Honours
Zenit Saint Petersburg
Russian Premier League: 2018–19, 2019–20, 2020–21
Russian Cup: 2019–20
Russian Super Cup: 2020

References

External links
 Profile by Russian Football National League
 

1999 births
Tabasaran people
Footballers from Saint Petersburg
Living people
Russian footballers
Russia youth international footballers
Russia under-21 international footballers
Association football midfielders
FC Zenit-2 Saint Petersburg players
FC Zenit Saint Petersburg players
FC Rubin Kazan players
Russian Premier League players
Russian First League players
Russian Second League players